(), also known as  when used as a  during Chinese opera performances, and  when it is blue in colour, is a traditional form of  in  and is also one of the most distinctive form of traditional clothing for the Han Chinese. The  can be dated back to at least the Ming dynasty but had actually been worn since the Song dynasty. Initially the daopao was a form of casual clothing which was worn by the middle or lower class in the Ming dynasty. In the middle and late Ming, it was one of the most common form of robes worn by men as casual clothing. The  was also a popular formal wear by the Ming dynasty scholars in their daily lives. It was also the daily clothing for the literati scholars in the Ming dynasty. In the late Ming, it was also a popular form of clothing among the external officials and eunuchs sometimes wore it.

This form of  worn taoist practitioners and taoist monks continued to be worn in the Qing dynasty as they were exempted from the  policy. The  of the Taoist also continue to be worn by modern taoist priests, although it may come in different names.

in

History and origins 

The  of this period was a type of new garment which only appeared in the Ming dynasty and was likely localized from and developed under the influence of the jisün the Yuan dynasty.

Other Chinese sources also indicate that the  had been worn since the Song dynasty (960–1279). After the year 960 AD, the belted  was worn by the Taoist priests in order to distinguish themselves from others.

Song dynasty 

In the Northern Song dynasty, Taoism was highly revered. During this period, the  also became very popular and was greatly appreciated by some hermits and scholars during the Song dynasty and was mentioned in some poems written by Wang Yucheng and Fan Zhongyan.

In the book Rules of Moral Teaching study by Zhu Xi, Zhu Xi stressed on the importance of dress code as being the first step for a person to be a "decent person". Contemporary observers living in the Southern Song dynasty, such as Shi Shengzu (1192－1274), also noted that the return of the classic-style apparel in the Song dynasty had made the  popular.

Ming dynasty 
The shape of the Ming dynasty , and its colours, was strictly regulated by the political systems, rules and regulations of the time.

Construction and design

Ming dynasty  

The Ming dynasty  is a full-length. It has a large frontal outer placket and smaller frontal inner placket. There is a pair of ties at the small placket and two pairs of ties on the large placket which is used for closing the garment. The sleeves are large but are narrower around the wrists. It characterized by a cross collar, which closes at the right side in the front, in a style called .It is also not completely stitched at the two sides and allows for side slits to begin below the waist level. At the sides of the robes, there are side panels in the form of concealed swing or pendulum structure (i.e. a front and back swings at each sides of the robe). These side panels at these slits, are called , and they were designed to conceal undergarments. 

The neckline of the robe is often decorated with white or plain collars. The collar can be either the same or a different colour to the main pieces of fabric. However, the collar is generally the same colour as the hems. An optional additional protective collar called  could also be sewn to the first collar. The  either be white or dark in colour.

A belt called  was also fastened around the waist. In total, the structure of the Ming dynasty  was made up of 10 parts.

Ming dynasty  

Derivatives and influences

China

In the Qing dynasty, actors who performed in Chinese opera performance were allowed to wear  and -style  as they were exempted from the  policy.

Performers playing female roles could also wear a  called , which was also used as an informal robe.

Construction and design 
The  is structurally different from the : the  has a trapezoid body, narrower sleeves which is tubular in shape, the sleeves are longer than the wrists, and water sleeves are also added; there is an asymmetrical closure where the right side is right below the shoulder and neck intersection while the left crossing over is tied right under the right arm in a style called . There are also differences in the shapes and forms of the  depending on the role types:

The  often wears  of pastel colours, which is embroidered with flowers and has water sleeves.

Korea 

In this period, the intellectual current which had been popularized in Joseon was the Zhuzi studies (viz. :  and ) which was of Chinese origins.

The traditional clothing worn by the Taoist community is connected to pre-modern Chinese clothing and styles. Tradition-based taoists will often wear the traditional robes and liturgical clothing for formal religious and ritual occasions while Zhengyi priests and taoists priests outside mainland China tend to wear Western clothing in their daily lives. The traditional taoist robes can also be worn as a daily lives clothing by the Quanzhen monastics in mainland China. There were many forms of daojiao fushi in the ancient China.

Daopao/ hechang 

Some forms of taoist robes are also referred as crane robes (hechang, 鶴氅). The Taoist priests' daopao which date back to at least the 1800s is not cross collared and instead looks like a beizi in terms of construction and design; a clothing artefact showing this style of daopao is now stored in museums such as the Rhode Island School of Design Museum. The Taoist's priest daopao are commonly worn by the Taoism priests. It is worn by middle-ranks Taoist priests; it is red in colour and has motifs at the back and front, on the sleeves. Theses motifs decorations can include, the bagua and cranes.

Jiangyi 
Jiangyi, also known as "robe of descent" which refers to either the descent of a priest from the altar or of the spirits to the altar, is a common form of Taoist priest's clothing. The jiangyi is a sign of the higher priestly rank and is worn by grandmasters. It was worn at least since the Ming and Qing dynasties.

It looks similar to a poncho in structure; when worn, the robe sits squarely on the shoulders of the Taoist' priest; it is usually fastened across the front with two silk ties which are sewn just above the waist level. It is made of embroidered silks and is composed of a large square of satin fabric folded into two to form the shoulder line; the shoulder lines continues to the hem of the sleeves. The robe is slashed in the middle to form the collar of the robe. It is typically trimmed with border decorations.

Daoyi 

The Quanzhen monastic taoist priests and nuns wear a wide-sleeved, cross-collared gown called daoyi (道衣; lit. "robe of the Dao") which closes to the right; it is a standard type of clothing. The sleeves of the daoyi is referred as "cloud sleeves"; they are wide, open at the ends, and their sleeves are so long that it is past the fingers when extended but can be even longer. In the Quanzhen order, the dagua is worn as one of the ordinary clothing while the deluo is a formal clothing.

Deluo 
The deluo (得罗) is a cross-collared gown with large sleeves. It is worn by Taoist priests of the Quanzhen order is a formal ritual dress which is indigo in colour. The blue colour is a symbolism for the east and represents having been descended from the first patriarch of the Quanzhen school, Donghua dijun. In large temples (e.g. Baiyunguan in Beijing), the deluo would be worn by monastics on festival days; the deluo would have wide sleeves which could reach 45 cm.

Daogua 
In the Wengong temple in Hanzhong, the cross-collar daopao is the standard form of attire and is referred as daogua ( depending on context). Their daopao is cross-collared at the front, and the sleeves are so long that only the fingers can escape from the sleeves. It is made of thick garments and is blue or black in colour. The daogua can be found in 3 types: dagua (a long cross-collar robe which reaches the ankles and has a 42 cm wide sleeves), zhonggua (中褂; a cross-collar robe which reaches the mid-calf and has slightly narrower sleeves than the dagua), and xiaogua (小褂; a cross-collar robe which reaches the hip and has sleeves which could either be the same size or narrower than a zhongua; the xiaogua is more similar to a jacket than a robe).

Similar garments 
 Sengyi (僧衣) - Long buddhist robes abbot.
 Hai Qing (海青) - Buddhist ritual garment.
Zhiduo, also known as zhishen (直身) - a style similar to the daopao except that it was decorated with outside pendulums.
Dopo (clothing) - A Korean equivalent

See also 
Hanfu
List of Hanfu
Paofu

References

Chinese traditional clothing